Statehood Day is a holiday that occurs on every 25 June in Slovenia to commemorate the country's  declaration of independence from Yugoslavia in 1991. Although the formal declaration of independence did not come until 26 June 1991, Statehood Day is considered to be 25 June since that was the date on which the initial acts regarding independence were passed and Slovenia became independent. Slovenia's declaration jumpstarted the Ten-Day War with Yugoslavia, which it eventually won.

Statehood Day is not to be confused with Slovenia's Independence and Unity Day, which is celebrated each year on 26 December in honour of 26 December 1990 official proclamation of the results of the plebiscite held three days earlier in which 88.5% of all Slovenian voters were in favor of Slovenia becoming a sovereign nation.

Croatia's Independence Day is celebrated on the same day, as the two countries declared their statehood and recognized each other's sovereignty on the same day. That date also used to mark Croatia's Statehood day until 2019.

See also
 Statehood Day (disambiguation) in other countries
 Holidays in Slovenia
 History of Slovenia
 Breakup of Yugoslavia

Notes and references

External links
BBC ON THIS DAY | 27 June|1991 – The BBC marks the date Yugoslavia entered Slovenia following Slovenia's declaration of independence

June observances
National days
Public holidays in Slovenia